Adetunji Idowu Ishola Olurin mni (3 December 1944 – 20 August 2021) was a Nigerian one-star general in the national army, who served as the military Governor of Oyo State and Field Commander of ECOMOG Peacekeeping Force in Liberia from 1992 to 1993 during the First Liberian Civil War. Olurin retired from service in 1993, and was a member of People's Democratic Party (PDP) in Nigeria. He was administrator of Ekiti State from 8 October 2006 until 27 April 2007.

Birth and education 
Tunji Olurin was born at Ilaro to the Chief M. A. O. Olurin, the Agoro of Ilaro, and Madam Abigail Fola Olurin.
He was educated at Egbado College (now Yewa College), and attended the Technical College, Ibadan (now Ibadan Polytechnic) in 1966. He became a trainee at the Times Press in Apapa, Lagos. In 1967, he entered the Nigerian Defence Academy (NDA), Kaduna, where he obtained his NDA Certificate of Education. He attended many professional courses during his army career. He was a graduate of the School of Infantry, Quetta, Pakistan, the Command and Staff College, Jaji, Kaduna and the National Institute for Policy and Strategic Studies, Kuru, Jos.

Military career 
Olurin enrolled into the Nigerian Army in 1967 as an officer cadet of the 3rd Regular Course where he obtained his NDACE (Nigerian Defence Academic of Education) and was commissioned a Second Lieutenant in the Nigerian Army in March 1970. He became the Brigade Battalion commander in Kainji in 1973, and was the Deputy Assistant Quartermaster General of the Nigerian Defence Academy, Kaduna.

He was Deputy Defence Adviser to the Nigerian High Commission in India (1975–1978) with the rank of major. After attending Staff College in 1978, he was deployed to the United Nations Peace Keeping Operation in Lebanon, where he commanded the Nigerian  troops in the United Nations Interim Force in Lebanon (UNIFIL). His battalion was deployed between the Palestinian and Israeli forces.
In 1981, as General Staff Officer Operations at Army Headquarters, he mobilized the OAU peacekeeping force in Chad. This force included troops from Nigeria, Senegal, Kenya and Zaire. Also in 1981, he conducted operations in Kano to suppress rebels led by religious fundamentalist.

At the time of the August 1985 coup, when Major General Muhammadu Buhari was deposed and replaced by Major General Ibrahim Babangida,
Lt. Col. Tunji Olurin was Commander of the 1st Mechanized Brigade, Minna. He was "aware" but not "active" in the coup.
After the coup, he was appointed the Military Governor of Oyo State (1985–1988). During his tenure as governor, he was a member of the National Council of States.
In 1987, he set up a committee that in 1988 recommended the establishment of what became the Ladoke Akintola University of Technology.

In 1990, Olurin became the General officer commanding the 3rd Armoured Division in Jos and a member of the Armed Forces Ruling Council.
He served as a Field Commander in the ECOMOG Peacekeeping Force in Liberia from December 1992 to September 1993, when he was relieved by Brigadier General John Nanzip Shagaya.
He used his trusted relationship with the Nigerian head of state, General Ibrahim Babangida, to obtain more troops for the mission, and by January 1993 had 16,000 troops under his command of whom 12,000 were Nigerian. Olurin was determined to force Charles Taylor onto the defensive. His aggressive tactics were militarily successful, forcing the NPFL to open negotiations by July 1993, although he was accused of showing favoritism to certain Liberian political groups.

Later career 

On 9 March 2002, Tunji Olurin was elected as the President of the Yewa Group (YG), formed to develop Yewaland in Ogun State.

On 26 September 2006, the Ekiti State House of Assembly impeached the governor, Ayodele Fayose and his deputy Abiodun Christine Olujimi, alleging gross misconduct. On 19 October 2006, President Olusegun Obasanjo declared a State of Emergency in Ekiti State and suspended the governor, deputy governor and House of Assembly of the state. He appointed  Tunji Olurin, as "Sole Administrator" on Ekiti State. The State of Emergency was ratified by the National Assembly on 26 October.
Soon after being appointed, Olurin dissolved the local government councils, who were under investigation by the Economic and Financial Crimes Commission (EFCC) for allegedly misappropriating about 7.3 billion naira.

In March 2007, Tunji Olurin ordered the Ekiti State radio and television stations not to broadcast programs of the Action Congress (AC) candidate for the state governorship, Kayode Fayemi, while allowing broadcasts by the PDP.
Olurin remained in charge until he was replaced by Tope Ademiluyi on 27 April 2007. He has since remained in political oblivion following his loss at the Ogun State Governorship Election in 2011.

Awards and honours 

Olurin has lectured on peacekeeping at the International Peace Academy, the National War College, and United Nations seminars in Ghana, Nigeria, and Senegal. In 2006, he was appointed the Chancellor of the First University of Education in Nigeria, TASUED by Governor Gbenga Daniel of Ogun State.

Olurin has been the recipient of many honours including the United Nations Peace Medal and the Knight Commander of the Humane Order of African Redemption (KCHOAR), Liberia’s highest national honour award. He was an honorary paramount chief of the Republic of Liberia.

References 

1944 births
2021 deaths
Yoruba military personnel
Nigerian generals
People from Ogun State
Governors of Ekiti State
Governors of Oyo State
Yoruba politicians
Peoples Democratic Party (Nigeria) politicians
The Polytechnic, Ibadan alumni
Ladoke Akintola University of Technology people
Members of the Nigerian National Institute of Policy and Strategic Studies
Nigerian Defence Academy alumni